The 2008 Lakeside World Professional Darts Championship was the 31st World Championship staged by the British Darts Organisation and was held between 5–13 January 2008 at the Lakeside Country Club, Frimley Green, Surrey.

Martin Adams attempted to defend the title that he won at the 14th attempt in 2007 but he lost in the Semi-Finals to Mark Webster. Webster won the World Championship, beating Simon Whitlock 7–5 in the final.

Anastasia Dobromyslova won the Women's World Championship, becoming the first player to beat Trina Gulliver in the World Championship. Gulliver had won all of the previous seven titles.

Prize money
The prize fund for the 2008 event is £310,000
Men's Champion: £85,000
Runner-up: £30,000
Semi-Finalists: £11,000 x 2
Quarter-Finalists: £6,000 x 4
Second Round: £4,250 x 8
First Round: £3,000 x 16

Women's Champion: £6,000
Runner-Up £2,000
Semi-Finalists: £1,000 x 2
Quarter-Finalists: £500 x 4

Nine dart finish: £52,000 (Men & Women)
Highest Checkout: £3,000 (Men & Women)

Seeds
Men
  Mark Webster
  Gary Anderson
  Scott Waites
  Martin Adams
  Tony O'Shea
  Co Stompé
  Ted Hankey
  Gary Robson
  Darryl Fitton
  Martin Atkins
  Brian Woods
  John Walton
  Shaun Greatbatch
  Mario Robbe
  Edwin Max
  Niels de Ruiter

Women
  Francis Hoenselaar
  Trina Gulliver
  Karin Krappen
  Anastasia Dobromyslova

Men's
 Match distances in sets are quoted in brackets at the top of each round. All sets best of five legs, unless there is a final set tie-break

Statistics

Women's Championship

Women's statistics

Television coverage
The tournament was covered by the BBC in the UK, SBS6 in the Netherlands and Eurosport across continental Europe.

BDO World Darts Championships
BDO World Darts Championship
BDO World Darts Championships
BDO World Darts Championships
Sport in Surrey
Frimley Green